João Ricardo Pinto da Silva (born 10 August 1991 in Espinho) is a Portuguese professional footballer who plays for Espinho as a midfielder.

External links

1991 births
People from Espinho, Portugal
Living people
Portuguese footballers
Association football midfielders
Liga Portugal 2 players
Segunda Divisão players
S.C. Espinho players
FC Porto players
Padroense F.C. players
C.D. Feirense players
Gondomar S.C. players
Académico de Viseu F.C. players
Anadia F.C. players
Sportspeople from Aveiro District